Barik Ab or Barikab, also rendered as Barkab, may refer to:
 Barik Ab, Khuzestan
 Barik Ab, Ijrud, Zanjan Province
 Barik Ab, Khodabandeh, Zanjan Province

See also
 Ab Barik (disambiguation)